Folly Gate is a village in the civil parish of Inwardleigh, in the West Devon district, in the county of Devon, England. It is situated near Okehampton. An airfield existed near the village between 1928 and 1960, it is now a field. In 1986 the village contained about 100 houses and had a population of 230.

References

Villages in the Borough of West Devon